Dysplastic nails are a cutaneous condition, and may be a subtle finding of ridging, flaking, or poor growth of the nails, or more diffuse with nearly complete loss of nails.  This condition may be seen in a number of syndromes, including Dyskeratosis congenita and Nail–patella syndrome.

See also 
 Nail disease
 List of cutaneous conditions

References

External links
Facial dysmorphism, skeletal anomalies, congenital glucoma, dysplastic nails: Mild Rubinstein-Taybi Syndrome. AJOL.info. Shawky, Rabah M.. Elsayed, Nermine S.. Seifeldin, Neveen S..

Conditions of the skin appendages